Gregory Tiernan (born June 19, 1965) is an Irish-born, Canadian-based animator, director and voice artist. Along with his wife Nicole Stinn, he founded Nitrogen Studios Canada, Inc. in 2003, through which he introduced CGI to the Thomas & Friends series. Prior to this, Tiernan collaborated on various projects with filmmaker Don Bluth, Walt Disney Animation Studios and Klasky Csupo, Inc. Nitrogen Studios was purchased by Cinesite and he now works for them.

Tiernan made his feature film debut with the long-gestating R-rated animated film Sausage Party (2016), joining Conrad Vernon to direct production of a story conceived by Seth Rogen, Evan Goldberg and Jonah Hill.

Career
Tiernan was trained in traditional animation for feature film in his native Ireland, at Don Bluth's now-defunct Dublin-based Sullivan Bluth Studios. There, he worked with Bluth in various capacities on the films An American Tail (1986), The Land Before Time (1988) and All Dogs Go to Heaven (1989). Tiernan later worked on one episode of the British children's animated series Danger Mouse for Cosgrove Hall, several episodes of Garfield & Friends, the 1983 animated series of the comic series Lucky Luke, Ralph Bakshi's live action and animation mixed feature film Cool World (1992) and two animated feature films from Germany Der kleene Punker (1992) and Felidae (1994) which was later released on YouTube premieres on 7 August 2013 in the USA, UK, Canada and any of countries lot of views in audiences for older teens and up. Soon after, he moved to Los Angeles and became a sequence director for Klasky Csupo. In addition to working on several episodes of Rugrats and The Wild Thornberrys, he made sequence contributions to the feature film spin-offs of both programs.

Tiernan's Hollywood years also saw him work extensively with Disney. His first projects included several titles in the company's PC games library, including projects associated with Disney's Aladdin (1992), The Lion King (1994), Hercules (1997) and Tarzan (1999). Also through Disney, he contributed storyboards to Mr. Magoo (1997), one of his few live-action projects.

After serving as an additional animator on The Tigger Movie (2000), Tiernan moved to Vancouver and founded Nitrogen Studios. Through this new venture, he helped develop God of War (2005), the first entry in the renowned PlayStation game series and the animated film Happily N'Ever After (2006). He joined the family of artists behind the Thomas & Friends franchise when he directed the home video feature Hero of the Rails (2009). This title became the first Thomas project to shelve the historical live-action animation technique in favor of CGI; all subsequent projects have been animated thus. Along with helming various additional home videos, Tiernan served as series director for Thomas & Friends from Series 13 to Series 16 and the other three films Misty Island Rescue (2010), Day of the Diesels (2011) and Blue Mountain Mystery (2012). Tiernan was also the CGI unit director for Series 12. He was also a huge fan of The Rev. W. Awdry's original Railway Series books and owns both The Island of Sodor: Its People, History and Railways and Sodor: Reading Between the Lines.

Tiernan also worked on several film projects when not working at Disney or Nitrogen or with Don Bluth, including VeggieTales, Roxy Hunter, Bionicle 2: Legends of Metru Nui and four Peanuts specials.

Tiernan gained new acclaim following the 2016 release of his feature film debut, Sausage Party (in which he also voiced a potato and a noodle soup can).

Tiernan also directed the CGI-animated version of The Addams Family (2019) and its sequel The Addams Family 2 (2021).

Allegations of mistreatment
Several days after the release of Sausage Party, allegations of poor treatment of Nitrogen Studios employees surfaced in the comments section of an interview with Tiernan and co-director Conrad Vernon, featured on the website Cartoon Brew. Various anonymous comments, from individuals purporting to be animators who worked on the film in question, made claims including that Nitrogen forced them to work overtime for free and that some employees were threatened with termination. One individual stated that Tiernan had developed a reputation for "disturbing behaviour and abusive management style". Publications such as the Washington Post, the Los Angeles Times, Dorkly and /Film later picked up the story.

References

External links
 
 Nitrogen Studios homepage
 Sausage Party official website

Living people
Canadian people of Irish descent
Artists from Vancouver
Film directors from Vancouver
Male actors from Vancouver
Canadian male voice actors
Canadian storyboard artists
Irish animators
Irish film directors
Irish male voice actors
Canadian animated film directors
Irish animated film directors
Walt Disney Animation Studios people
Irish expatriates in Canada
Irish expatriates in the United States
1965 births